Bon Lar (also Romanized as Bon Lār; also known as Boneh-ye Lār, Būnelār, Būnhalār, Būnlār, and Būnneh Lār) is a village in Afrineh Rural District, Mamulan District, Pol-e Dokhtar County, Lorestan Province, Iran. At the 2006 census, its population was 1,041, in 195 families.

References 

Towns and villages in Pol-e Dokhtar County